I Rest My Case is the fifth studio album by American rapper YoungBoy Never Broke Again. It was released on January 6, 2023, through Motown Records and Never Broke Again. It features production from YoungBoy's in-house engineer, Jason "Cheese" Goldberg, alongside D-Roc, DJ Trebble, Dmac, Getro, Kid Krazy, Powers Pleasant, TnTXD, Wayv and Yo Benji.

It is YoungBoy's first studio project with Motown since signing with the label in October 2022 following the completion of his contract with Atlantic Records earlier that year.

Release and promotion
I Rest My Case was first announced by YoungBoy Never Broke Again through his official Instagram page in December 2022, where he stated that an album would be released in January. Despite the album initially being titled Black, through YoungBoy's Amp radio show, he stated that the album's name would be changed to I Rest My Case. Weeks later, YoungBoy's label Never Broke Again revealed the album's initial cover art, however, it received backlash from supporters. Days later, a new cover art was announced which received much more support.

Singles
"Top Girls", "Black", "I Love YB Skit", and "Groovy" were all released as promotional singles on January 4, 2023, prior to the album's official tracklist being announced.

Critical reception

I Rest My Case received mediocre reviews from music critics. Paul Simpson from AllMusic noted that YoungBoy "appears to be his attempt to hop on the trend known as rage." He concluded his review as he stated wrote that he's "not entirely as unhinged as one might expect from a YoungBoy rage album, it's still a step in a new direction for him." Robin Murray from Clash stated that "YoungBoy Never Broke Again is an unrelenting force in Stateside trap music." Continuing his review, Murray noted that "dealing with fatherhood and responsibility, it pushes his almost punk-like energy in a different direction." Concluding his review, Murray wrote, "An album of subtle progress, 'I Rest My Case' could prove to be his definitive work."

Writing for HipHopDX, Nadine Smith writes that "he’s developed a dependable sound, not quite country rap, but aching with a bluesy soulfulness and frequently accompanied by classical guitar," this was followed up by her stating that "it’s a style he does well, but his voice ecompasses a wider spectrum of timbres and emotions." Concluding the review, Nadine notes that "within those 19 tracks, there’s a more experimental EP, but because of the expectations YoungBoy has established for himself, it feels padded out to album-length with what could easily be leftover scraps from past sessions," finishing off by writing, "YoungBoy’s voice makes a compelling argument for itself, but tightening the focus might help strengthen his case as an artist."

Jason Lipshutz from Billboard stated that, "YoungBoy generally gets more discerning and ferocious with every new project, and I Rest My Case is one of his strongest full-lengths to date."

Commercial performance
I Rest My Case debuted at number nine on the US Billboard 200 chart, earning 29,000 album-equivalent units (including 1,000 copies in pure album sales) in its first week. The album also accumulated a total of 39.59 million on-demand streams of the album's songs.

Track listing

Personnel
Credits adapted from Tidal.

 YoungBoy Never Broke Again – vocals
 Jason "Cheese" Goldberg – mastering, mixing
 Khris "XO" James – engineering

Charts

References

2023 albums
Motown albums
YoungBoy Never Broke Again albums